Cham Takleh may refer to:

Cham Takleh-ye Olya
Cham Takleh-ye Sofla